Stephen Horne (born June 10, 1958) is an American politician. He is a member of the Mississippi House of Representatives from the 81st District, being first elected in 2003. He is a member of the Republican party.

References

1958 births
Living people
Republican Party members of the Mississippi House of Representatives
21st-century American politicians